Pisano may refer to:

 Pisano, a native or inhabitant of Pisa, Italy
 Pisano (surname), a list of people
 Pisano, Piedmont, commune in the province of Novara, in northern Italy
 Pisano period, in number theory
 Pisanello (1380–1456), Italian artist sometimes erroneously called Vittore Pisano

See also 
 
 Pisa (disambiguation)
 Pisana (disambiguation)
 Pisani (disambiguation)
 Pisanu, a surname